Eero-Matti Aho (born 26 January 1968) is a Finnish actor who has appeared on stage, in films and on television. He plays Antero Rokka in film The Unknown Soldier (2017), and stars as Inspector Koskinen in the crime television series Lakeside Murders.

Selected filmography

Harjunpää ja kiusantekijät (1992)
Romanovin kivet (1993)
Juna (short, 1994)
Häjyt (1999)
Juoksuhaudantie (2004)
Käsky (2008)
Hyvä poika (2011)
8-pallo (2013)
The Unknown Soldier (2017)
Omerta 6/12 (2021)

References

External links

21st-century Finnish male actors
Finnish male film actors
1968 births
Living people
20th-century Finnish male actors
Finnish male stage actors
Finnish male television actors
Actors from Oulu